The Woman of Fire '82 is a 1982 South Korean film written and directed by Kim Ki-young. This was the third film in Kim's Housemaid trilogy.

Plot
A variation on Kim's classic The Housemaid (1960). The lives of a composer and his chicken-farming wife are thrown into turmoil when a young woman comes to work as a maid.

Cast
Kim Ji-mee
Na Young-hee
Jeon Moo-song
Kim Hae-sook
Yeo Jae-ha
Kim Sung-kyom
Kim Won-seop
Cho Ju-mi
Lee Yeong-ho
Park Yae-sook

References

Bibliography

External links

Maids in films
1980s Korean-language films
Films directed by Kim Ki-young
South Korean romantic thriller films
South Korean erotic thriller films